WQCS (FM 88.9) is the National Public Radio member station for the Treasure Coast of Florida.  Licensed to Fort Pierce, it is owned by Indian River State College, with studios in building Q of the college's main campus in Fort Pierce.

The station signed on in March 1982, originally at 88.3 FM, and operating at 3,000 watts from the McAlpin Fine Arts Center.  Four years later, it boosted its power to 100,000 watts, more than tripling its coverage area in the process, and moved to its current dial position at 88.9 FM.  The format is a mix of classical music and NPR talk programming.  WQCS also broadcasts in HD.  It offers a 24-hour news/talk station on HD 2, and a classic hits station known as "The River" (taken from a nickname for the college) on HD 3.

Gallery

External links
 

QCS
NPR member stations
Fort Pierce, Florida
Radio stations established in 1982
1982 establishments in Florida